Matt Keetley (born April 27, 1986) is a Canadian former professional ice hockey goaltender who played in one game for Calgary Flames of the National Hockey League (NHL).

Personal life
Born in Medicine Hat, Alberta, Keetley spent his early years living in Richmound, Saskatchewan where he grew up playing minor hockey with future Medicine Hat Tigers teammate Stefan Meyer. During his teenage years Keetley's family moved back to Medicine Hat, the community that is still his off season home.

Playing career
Keetley began his major junior career in 2003–04 with the Medicine Hat Tigers of the Western Hockey League (WHL). He initially began the season in the Alberta Midget Hockey League, but took over as the starting goalie for the Tigers during the 2004 WHL playoffs, subsequently leading the club to a President's Cup championship. In Keetley's draft year, he led the WHL with a 1.66 goals against average and a .933 save percentage. He was then drafted in the fifth round of the 2005 NHL Entry Draft, 158th overall by the Calgary Flames.

Keetley returned to the WHL for two more seasons, putting together his most accomplished major junior campaign in 2006–07. In the regular season, Keetley led the league with 42 wins and was named to the WHL East First All-Star Team. In the playoffs, Keetley won the airBC Trophy as playoff MVP, leading the Tigers to their second WHL championship in four years. Advancing to the 2007 Memorial Cup, Keetley won the Hap Emms Memorial Trophy as the tournament's outstanding goaltender and was named to the Memorial Cup All-Star Team as the Tigers fell to tournament hosts and WHL runners-up, the Vancouver Giants.

During the Memorial Cup tournament, on May 22, 2007, the Flames signed Keetley to an entry-level contract. In 2007–08, Keetley was assigned by the Flames to their American Hockey League (AHL) affiliate, the Quad City Flames. He was called up to play backup to Flames starter Miikka Kiprusoff on several occasions throughout the season. In a game against the Colorado Avalanche on November 5, 2007, Keetley made his NHL debut, replacing Kiprusoff with just under 10 minutes to go in the third period, making two saves. Keetley completed his rookie professional season with a 10-8 record with Quad City to go with a 2.33 goals against average and a .933 save percentage.

To begin the 2008–09 season, Keetley was named AHL Player of the Week on October 27, 2008. On February 10, 2009, Keetley was reassigned to Calgary's ECHL affiliate in Las Vegas for seven games before returning to Quad City's roster. One year later, the Abbotsford Heat assigned Keetley to the Victoria Salmon Kings for conditioning purposes from November 10–17, 2009. During his brief three game stint with Victoria, Keetley recorded two wins and two shutouts and was named the ECHL's Goaltender of the Week on November 17, 2009, before he returned to the Heat's lineup.

Awards
Major Junior
Won the President's Cup/Ed Chynoweth Cup as WHL champions with the Medicine Hat Tigers in 2004 and 2007.
Named to the WHL East Second All-Star Team in 2006.
Named to the WHL East First All-Star Team in 2007.
Awarded the airBC Trophy as WHL playoff MVP in 2007.
Named to the Memorial Cup Tournament All-Star Team in 2007.
Awarded the Hap Emms Memorial Trophy as Memorial Cup top goaltender in 2007.

Professional
Named AHL Player of the Week on October 27, 2008.
Named Reebok Hockey ECHL Goaltender of the Week on November 17, 2009.
Named Ronald Allen Clothiers-Abbotsford Heat Player of the Month for December.

Career statistics

Regular season

Playoffs

See also
List of players who played only one game in the NHL

References

External links
 
Matt Keetley's WHL Profile
Matt Keetley on GoaliesArchive.com

1986 births
Living people
Abbotsford Heat players
Calgary Flames draft picks
Calgary Flames players
Canadian ice hockey goaltenders
Ice hockey people from Alberta
Ice hockey people from Saskatchewan
Las Vegas Wranglers players
Medicine Hat Tigers players
Sportspeople from Medicine Hat
Quad City Flames players
Victoria Salmon Kings players